Ribozyme is a Norwegian hard rock band formed in 1998. It features progressive drum beats, emotionally strong guitars and an ever-changing vocal style. It has been classified as dark, but not Gothic; angry, but not violent; sad, but not tearful, not hard, but still heavy.

After the release of their first EP in 1999, they were featured on the by:Larm festival which led to a massive increase in popularity and allowed them to release an album. In 2004, after two albums, two EPs and a single, one of the guitar players, Jan Ove Knutsen quit the band to concentrate on his family, forcing the band to consider their future. They opted for not hiring another guitarist and instead re-wrote a lot of their old material and experimented with a new sound.

In 2005 the band went on their first European tour, after more than 100 concerts in Norway.

In August 2006, only a couple of weeks before the release of Blacklist Mercy, drummer Frank Hertzberg was replaced with Cato Olaisen from the band Major Parkinson. The band toured Norway to support the release, and did also return to Germany for three concerts early in 2007. After playing festivals in Norway in the summer of 2007, the band went into the rehearsal studio to write their next record. In April 2009 Cato Olaisen left Major Parkinson to concentrate his time on Ribozyme, and later that year, on 17 August 2009, their latest release, March Of Crime was released in Norway, and received great reviews in the media. This was Ribozyme's first album with their current lineup which led to a different approach to the band's sound and musical expression. They were also made Ukas Urørt for the track One Day Worth. The band went on to release full-length albums Presenting The Problem in 2012 and Grinding Tune in May, 2015.

Discography

EPs
 Ribozyme (1999)
 Twintracks (2002)

Singles
 Invidia (2003)
 Trail of Moment (2004)
 Timely Reminder (2015)

Albums
 (Zilch) (2001)
 Invidia (2003)
 Blacklist Mercy (2006)
 March Of Crime (2009)
 Presenting The Problem (2012)
 Grinding Tune (2015)

References

External links
 Official website
 Ribozyme at Urørt (Norwegian)
 Robozyme at MySpace

Norwegian hard rock musical groups
Norwegian progressive rock groups
Musical groups established in 1998
1998 establishments in Norway
Musical groups from Bergen